The 1968 South Australian state election was held on 2 March 1968.

Retiring Members

Labor

 Frank Walsh, MHA (Edwardstown)

Liberal and Country

 Percy Quirke, MHA (Burra)
 George Bockelberg, MHA (Eyre)
 Thomas Playford, MHA (Gumeracha)
 Howard Shannon, MHA (Onkaparinga)
 James Heaslip, MHA (Rocky River)

House of Assembly
Sitting members are shown in bold text. Successful candidates are highlighted in the relevant colour. Where there is possible confusion, an asterisk (*) is also used.

Legislative Council
Sitting members are shown in bold text. Successful candidates are highlighted in the relevant colour and identified by an asterisk (*).

References

Candidates for South Australian state elections
1960 elections in Australia
1960s in South Australia